Motive (formerly KeepTruckin) is a technology company that builds products to improve the safety, productivity, and profitability of businesses that power the physical economy.

The Motive Automated Operations Platform combines IoT hardware with AI-powered applications to automate vehicle and equipment tracking, driver safety, compliance, maintenance, spend management, and more.

History

Founding 
In 2013, Shoaib Makani with co-founders, Ryan Johns and Obaid Khan, founded KeepTruckin to improve the safety and efficiency of businesses that keep the economy moving. They began with an electronic logbook app for drivers to record their hours of service (HOS). Over time, they expanded the platform to solve a broad range of operational problems businesses face including vehicle and equipment tracking, driver safety, compliance, maintenance, spend management and more.

2022 rebrand 
In 2022, KeepTruckin rebranded as Motive to reflect the breadth of problems the company solves and the wide range of industries the company serves outside of long-haul trucking.

Present 
Motive now serves more than 120,000 businesses, across a wide range of industries including trucking and logistics, construction, oil and gas, food and beverage, field service, agriculture, passenger transit, and delivery. Motive has more than 3,500 employees across eight global offices.

Funding history 
In 2013, the company secured seed capital in the amount of $2.3 million.

In 2015, the company secured $8 million in Series A venture funding led by Index Ventures.

In 2017, the company secured $18 million in Series B venture funding led by Scale Venture Partners, Index Ventures and GV, the venture capital investment arm of Alphabet Inc.

In 2018, the company secured $50 million in Series C venture funding led by IVP, GV, Index Ventures, and Scale Venture Partners.

In 2019, the company secured $149 million in Series D venture funding, mostly from Capital. 

In 2021, the company secured $200 million in Series E venture funding, led by G2VP.

In 2022, the company secured $150 million in Series F venture funding co-led by Insight Partners and Kleiner Perkins. After funding, Motive reached a $2.85 billion valuation.

Products 
Motive combines an IoT platform with AI-powered applications to automate the management of physical operations.

Applications 
Sitting atop Motive’s IoT platform are applications that automate vehicle and equipment tracking, driver safety, compliance, maintenance, spend management, and much more. These include:

 Tracking and telematics
 Driver safety
 Compliance
 Dispatch and workflow
 Maintenance
 Sustainability
 Spend management

IoT platform 
At Motive’s core is an IoT platform that connects vehicles, equipment, and facilities. It unlocks the data that makes automated operations possible. These include:

 Vehicle Gateway
 Asset Gateway
 AI Dashcam
 Environmental sensors
 OEM telematics

See also
 Software as a service
 Fleet management software
 Hours of service
 Electronic logging device
 Trucking industry in the United States

References

Companies based in San Francisco